Benjamin John Christophers (born 1969) is an English singer-songwriter and multi-instrumentalist from Wolverhampton, West Midlands, England. To date he has released five albums: the first two on Virgin Records' V2 label, the third on Cooking Vinyl and the two most recent on his own label, Rocketeer.

He collaborated with French singer Françoise Hardy, for whom he wrote the song "La Folie ordinaire" released on her album "Tant de belles choses" in 2004. On 12 February 2006 he sang a duet, "My Beautiful Demon", on her follow-up album entitled Parenthèses.

In 2001, Christophers performed in support of Tori Amos whilst promoting his critically acclaimed album Spoonface. Manchester Evening News reported that he "wowed the crowd...So much so that the ovation at the end was deafening" and also remarked on how many instruments he played.

Christophers has more recently supported Bat for Lashes on BBC Radio 1's Live Lounge with Jo Whiley, on BBC television's Later... with Jools Holland and the Late Show with David Letterman on US television.

Christophers performed with Imogen Heap on Leg 6 of her Ellipse Tour as an opening act as well as support for Heap on guitar and keyboards. In 2015 he played keyboards on Courting the Squall the first solo studio album of Guy Garvey which was released on 30 October 2015 by Polydor Records.

2016 saw Christophers co-produce Bat for Lashes Mercury Prize nominated album The Bride.

Discography 
My Beautiful Demon (1999)
Spoonface (2001)
The Spaces in Between (2004)
Viewfinder (2005)
Ben Christophers (2010)

References

External links
Bat for Lashes website

1969 births
Living people
English male singer-songwriters
musicians from Wolverhampton